Oil and Natural Gas Corporation Football Club, also known as ONGC FC, was an Indian professional football club from Mumbai in Maharashtra, India. The club was affiliated with the Oil and Natural Gas Corporation. It has competed in the National Football League (India), later I-League, alongside the MDFA Elite League.

History

2006–2010: I-League 2nd Division

In 2006, the Oil and Natural Gas Corporation revived its football section and renamed it as ONGC F.C., in hope of expanding their involvement in Indian football, which included title sponsoring the old National Football League, Durand Cup and Nehru Cup. In their inaugural season in the I-League 2nd Division, the club finished on 6th place. After their first season, the club offered their players full-time contracts and higher salaries, as well as inducting youth sections. These changes helped the club finish on 5th place in the final round of the 2009 I-League 2nd Division, after topping the group stage. The next season would finally see ONGC get promoted, after the club won the 2010 I-League 2nd Division and went undefeated in the final round. It was the club's biggest achievement in domestic football.

In 2010, Caetano Pinho became the head coach of ONGC and helped the team winning the I-League 2nd Division and qualified for the 2010–11 season of I-League. Unfortunately, after one season in the I-League, the club were relegated back into the 2nd Division and Pinho's job was on the line as ONGC were considering folding the club. Even Pinho himself said: "The club's poor showing had not gone down well with the management, who it was believed were even considering the most extreme of repercussions. For a company which supports 16 different disciplines of sports around the country, they had after all pumped in the maximum amount of money into the football club's coffers."

2010–2014: I-League and back
After earning promotion into the I-League, ONGC made some unexpected signings with the signatures of Nigerian David Opara and re-signing Badmus Babatunde, who was the overall top-scorer during the 2010 I-League 2nd Division, and signing former India national football team goalkeeper Rajat Ghosh Dastidar. ONGC played their first match of the 2010–11 on 4 December 2010 against East Bengal at the Salt Lake Stadium, in which they lost 1–0. It took the club register first win till 9 January 2011 against Viva Kerala at home with David Opara scoring the lone goal for ONGC. Then on 12 February 2011, ONGC created the biggest shock of the season after defeating East Bengal, who were undefeated before the game, 1–0 with Babatunde scoring in 58th minute at Cooperage Ground. Despite the unexpected result, ONGC could only do so much as despite scoring 11 more goals in the 2nd half of the season, they ultimately finished on last 14th place, which meant straight relegation back into 2nd Division after only one season.

ONGC began their mission for a comeback to the I-League by entering the 2012 I-League 2nd Division. The immediately made an impact after finishing the group stage in first place and entered the final round as automatic contenders. After a tough 12 matches in Siliguri and Sikkim, ONGC again finished in a promotion spot, 2nd place, and thus qualified for the 2012–13 I-League, which was confirmed on 17 April 2012, after the club drew 1–1 with Aizawl. ONGC finished the next I-League season on 9th position with 31 points in 26 matches.

The club has also participated in the 2013 IFA Shield unlikely. On 4 March 2013, it was announced that Muktijoddha Sangsad KC of Bangladesh would not participate in this tournament and instead current I-League club ONGC would take their place. But they failed to qualify for the knockout stages.

In 2014, they participated in the 14th Darjeeling Gold Cup and won the tournament with a 5–0 win over Dalhousie AC of Kolkata in final.

Sikkim Gold Cup win
In October 2014, ONGC participated in Sikkim Governor's Gold and reached to the final with a 2–1 win over Gangtok Himalayan. They clinched the trophy defeating Manang Marshyangdi Club of Nepal on penalty shoot-out.

In leagues of Mumbai
Since their inception, ONGC became a member of Western India Football Association (WIFA) and Mumbai District Football Association (formerly BDFA). They participated in later editions of Mumbai Harwood League alongside Maharashtra Football League.

Before getting revived in 2006, they participated in B.D.F.A League, and W.I.F.A. Super Division from 1990 to 1999 and clinched BDFA title in 1993.

ONGC also participated in MDFA Elite Division, and lifted trophies in 2015–16 and 2017–18 season.

Expulsion
In spite of finishing 9th in the 2012–13 I-League table with 36 points, ONGC were excluded from the next season, because they did not meet the AFC's club licensing criteria.
New club Oil India has taken sponsorship and majority of ONGC's squad in the following years.

Stadium

ONGC played all their home matches for the National Football League and I-League at the Cooperage Football Ground, which is located at the Nariman Point, Mumbai. It has a capacity of 5,000.

During the 2010–11 I-League season, Rajarshi Shahu Stadium in Kolhapur, hosted numerous matches of Mumbai teams due to unavailability of Cooperage Ground. ONGC played its home games at this ground throughout the season.

Notable players
For all former notable players of ONGC FC with a Wikipedia article, see: ONGC FC players.

Honours

League
 I-League 2nd Division
Champions (1): 2010
Runners-up (1): 2012
 Mumbai Football League (MDFA Elite Division)
Champions (4): 1993, 2011–12, 2015–16, 2017–18
Runners-up (1): 2016–17

Cup
 Sikkim Governor's Gold Cup
Champions (2): 2010, 2014
 Bordoloi Trophy
Runners-up (1): 2007
Durand Cup
Runners-up (1): 2013
Kalinga Cup
Champions (1): 2014
Darjeeling Gold Cup
Champions (1): 2014
 YMFC Centennial All India Football Tournament
Winners (1): 2016
 Nadkarni Cup
Champions (1): 2014
Runners-up (1): 2007
 Hot Weather Football Championship
Runners-up (1): 2007
 All-India Ballarpur Industries Limited Trophy
Runners-up (1): 2002

Other department

Field hockey
ONGC has its field hockey team. It previously competed in Beighton Cup, one of world's oldest hockey tournaments. They finished as runners-up in the prestigious trophy in 2011 and 2013. Affiliated with the Bombay Hockey Association, ONGC also appeared in Bombay Gold Cup and Guru Tegh Bahadur Gold Cup.

Honours
 Beighton Cup
Runners-up (2): 2011, 2013
Guru Tegh Bahadur Gold Cup
Runners-up (1): 2010
Surjit Memorial Hockey Tournament
Runners-up (1): 2017
Senior Nehru Hockey Tournament
Champions (1): 2011
Runners-up (1): 2010
UP Hockey Championship
Champions (1): 2013–14
PSPB Hockey Tournament
Champions (1): 2014
Murugappa Gold Cup
Champions (1): 2017
AIPSSPB Hockey Trophy
Champions (1): 2018
Inter-Unit PSPB hockey tournament
Champions (1): 2018

See also
 Sports in Maharashtra
 List of football clubs in Mumbai

References

Further reading

External links

ONGC FC at GSA
 ONGC FC at Soccerway
 ONGC FC at Khel Now

 
Association football clubs established in 2006
Football clubs in Mumbai
I-League clubs
I-League 2nd Division clubs
2006 establishments in Maharashtra
Oil and Natural Gas Corporation
Works association football clubs in India